The Jabra Ladies Classic is a women's professional golf tournament held at Glendower Golf Club near Johannesburg, South Africa. It has been an event on the Southern Africa-based Sunshine Ladies Tour since 2014.

The 2022 event saw a battle between LPGA Tour players Paula Reto and Linn Grant for the title, with Grant coming out on top after a birdie on the final hole. Grant had already signalled a warning to the field when she fired a round of 62 in the pro-am on Tuesday.

Winners

References

External links
Coverage on the Sunshine Ladies Tour's official site

Sunshine Ladies Tour events
Golf tournaments in South Africa